Evadne is a name from Greek mythology.

Evadne may also refer to:

Evadne (crustacean), a genus of water fleas
HMS Evadne, a yacht launched in 1931 and converted into a naval vessel during the Second World War

People with the given name
Evadne Baker (1937–1995), South African actress
Evadne Price (1888–1985), Australian-British writer, actress, and media personality
Evadne de Silva, Sri Lankan politician

See also